Ageratina rothrockii (Rothrock's snakeroot) is a North American species of plants in the family Asteraceae. It is found only in the southwestern United States in the states of Arizona, New Mexico, and Texas, as well as the states of Sonora, Coahuila, Chihuahua, and Durango in Mexico.

Etymology
Ageratina is derived from Greek meaning 'un-aging', in reference to the flowers keeping their color for a long time. This name was used by Dioscorides for a number of different plants.

The species is named for American botanist and forester Joseph Rothrock, 1839–1922.

References

rothrockii
Flora of the South-Central United States
Plants described in 1884
Flora of the Southwestern United States
Flora of Northwestern Mexico
Flora of Northeastern Mexico